Addison Lockley (born 25 October 1991) is a rugby union player. His position of choice is Lock. He was released from Exeter Chiefs among other players
, and will play for Moseley in the 2012-13 season.
On 25 April 2013, Lockley would leave Moseley to join top French club Biarritz Olympique in the Top 14 on a two-year contract from 2013/14 season.

References
Academy players enjoy promotion too

External links
 Exeter Profile

1991 births
Living people
English rugby union players
Exeter Chiefs players
Moseley Rugby Football Club players
Rugby union players from Taunton
Plymouth Albion R.F.C. players
Rugby union locks